Water polo events were contested at the 1999 Summer Universiade in Palma de Mallorca, Spain.

References
 Universiade water polo medalists on HickokSports

1999 Summer Universiade
Universiade
1999
1999